The following is a list of programs broadcast by Kapamilya Channel, a 24-hour Philippine pay television network owned and operated by ABS-CBN Corporation, a company under the Lopez Group. The network serves as the replacement of the main terrestrial ABS-CBN network after ceasing its free-to-air broadcast operations as ordered by the National Telecommunications Commission (headed by Gamaliel Cordoba) and former Solicitor General Jose Calida on May 5, 2020. Kapamilya Channel carried most of the programs that ABS-CBN aired before the shutdown.

For the previously aired shows of the network, see the list of programs aired by Kapamilya Channel and the list of ABS-CBN drama series.

Current original programs

News and current affairs
 Kabayan 
 KBYN: Kaagapay ng Bayan 
 News Patrol 
 Sakto 
 TeleRadyo Balita 
 TV Patrol 
 TV Patrol Weekend 
 The World Tonight

Drama
Anthology
 Ipaglaban Mo! 

Series
 Ang sa Iyo Ay Akin 
 A Soldier's Heart 
 Be Careful with My Heart 
 Dirty Linen 
 FPJ's Batang Quiapo 
  Beach Bros 
 The Iron Heart

Animated
 Hero City Kids Force

Variety
 ASAP Natin 'To 
 It's Showtime

Kids-oriented
 Pop Babies 
 Team Yey!

Educational
 Mang Lalakbay 
 MathDali 
 Parent Experiment 
 Ready, Set, Read! 
 Wikaharian 
 Wow

Reality
 The Voice Kids (season 5)  
 I Can See Your Voice

Talk
 Magandang Buhay )

Comedy
 Goin' Bulilit

Informative
 Team FitFil

Religious
 Kapamilya Daily Mass 
 The Healing Eucharist Sunday TV Mass

Current acquired programs

Cartoons
 Masha and the Bear 
 Pororo the Little Penguin

Variety
 Tropang LOL

Current affairs
 Rated Korina

Film and special presentation
 FPJ Da King 
 Kapamilya Action Sabado 
 Kapamilya Gold Hits 
 KB Family Weekend 
 Movie Central Presents 
 Sunday's Best 
 Super Kapamilya Blockbusters

Foreign drama
 The Great Show 
 Hotel del Luna

See also
List of programs distributed by ABS-CBN
List of programs broadcast by ABS-CBN
List of programs broadcast by A2Z (Philippine TV channel)
List of programs broadcast by TV5 (Philippine TV network)
List of programs broadcast by Kapamilya Online Live
List of ABS-CBN specials aired

References

ABS-CBN
ABS-CBN Corporation
Lists of television series by network
Philippine television-related lists